The Rubén Darío National Theatre is the national theatre of Nicaragua. It is located in the capital, Managua, and was named in honor of Nicaragua's (and one of Latin America's) most renowned poets, Rubén Darío.

History
The National Theater was one of the few major buildings to survive, within the centre of Managua, after the devastating 1972 Managua earthquake.

The Theater
The Nicaraguan National Theater is a leading venue for cultural life in Managua, including music, theater and the visual arts.  The theater serves as the most important theater for shows and concerts.

See also
Culture of Nicaragua

External links
Rubén Darío National Theater Official Website
Vianica.com All about the National Theater.

Buildings and structures in Managua
Theatres in Nicaragua
National theatres
Tourist attractions in Managua
Buildings and structures completed in 1969
Opera houses in Nicaragua
Palaces in Nicaragua